The Ghana beaked blind snake (Letheobia coecatus) is a species of snake in the family Typhlopidae. It is endemic to West Africa and is known from Ghana, Ivory Coast, and Guinea.

References

coecatus
Snakes of Africa
Reptiles of West Africa
Fauna of Ghana
Fauna of Guinea
Fauna of Ivory Coast
Reptiles described in 1863
Taxa named by Giorgio Jan